Deltoid (delta-shaped) can refer to:

 The deltoid muscle, a muscle in the shoulder
 Kite (geometry), also known as a deltoid, a type of quadrilateral
 A deltoid curve, a three-cusped hypocycloid
 A leaf shape
 The deltoid tuberosity, a part of the humerus
 The deltoid ligament, a ligament in the ankle

See also 
Delta (disambiguation)
The Deltoid Pumpkin Seed (1973), a book by John McPhee